Chan Suk Yuen (born 25 June 1969) is a Hong Kong table tennis player. She competed in the women's singles event at the 1992 Summer Olympics.

References

External links
 

1969 births
Living people
Hong Kong female table tennis players
Olympic table tennis players of Hong Kong
Table tennis players at the 1992 Summer Olympics
Place of birth missing (living people)
Asian Games medalists in table tennis
Asian Games silver medalists for Hong Kong
Asian Games bronze medalists for Hong Kong
Table tennis players at the 1990 Asian Games
Table tennis players at the 1994 Asian Games
Medalists at the 1990 Asian Games
Medalists at the 1994 Asian Games
20th-century Hong Kong women